Daisuke Nakazawa (born 1979) is   head chef of the eponymous Sushi Nakazawa  in New York City. Nakazawa  apprenticed at Sukiyabashi Jiro under Jiro Ono, and  appeared in the David Gelb documentary Jiro Dreams of Sushi. Nakazawa lived and worked in Seattle, at Sushi Kashiba under chef Shiro Kashiba, another Jiro Ono mentored chef, for several years before coming to New York to open Sushi Nakazawa, where he remains.

References

External links

1979 births
Living people
Japanese chefs
Head chefs of Michelin starred restaurants